Still Standing is an American sitcom created by Diane Burroughs and Joey Gutierrez, that ran on CBS from September 30, 2002, to March 8, 2006. It starred Mark Addy and Jami Gertz as Bill and Judy Miller, a working-class couple living in Chicago. Taylor Ball, Renee Olstead, and Soleil Borda portrayed their children and Jennifer Irwin portrayed Judy's sister Linda.

Plot 
A working-class couple in Chicago tries to instill good values in their three kids, Brian (Taylor Ball), Lauren (Renee Olstead), and Tina (Soleil Borda), but their own past experiences often conflict with the lessons they teach their children. Judy Miller (Jami Gertz) is the attractive wife, who was wooed by Bill (Mark Addy). Judy's sister Linda (Jennifer Irwin) continuously butts heads with Bill.

Characters

Main characters 
 William "Bill" Miller (Mark Addy): The patriarch of the Miller family. He was a former high school football standout, but is now often perceived as overweight and lazy. 
 Judith "Judy" Miller (née Michaels) (Jami Gertz): The matriarch of the Miller family. 
 Brian Hops Miller (Taylor Ball): Eldest and only son of the Miller family. Brian is a gifted but relatively unpopular high-school student; widely regarded as a geek.
 Lauren Barley Miller (Renee Olstead): The older daughter of the Miller family. Lauren is one of the beautiful, popular girls at school.
 Tina Kathleen Miller (Soleil Borda): The youngest child of the Miller family. She is very eccentric and does not fit the mold of a "typical" little girl.
 Linda Michaels (Jennifer Irwin): Judy's younger sister. Linda spends much of her time hanging around the Miller house, much to Bill's dismay. In early episodes she is single and portrayed as a "crazy cat lady" until her cat Nathaniel Pawthorne dies in season 3 and she meets her later husband, Perry. 
 Daniel "Fitz" Fitzsimmons (Joel Murray): Bill's best friend, who works with Bill as a salesman.

Guest and recurring roles 
 Perry (James Patrick Stuart): Linda's husband, a musician who performs in Reno. He speaks with a British accent, but it is revealed later that he adopted it because he liked the way it sounded and is not actually British.
 Marion Fitzsimmons (Kerri Kenney): Fitz's wife. She is considered controlling by Fitz, and is very much portrayed as not being on the same page, humor-wise, with Fitz, Bill and Judy – one of the factors behind her and Judy not always getting along. 
 Gene Michaels (Steven Gilborn): Judy and Linda's father. He is an avid collector of model trains.
 Helen Michaels (Janet Carroll, seasons 1 and 2; Swoosie Kurtz, seasons 3 and 4): Judy and Linda's mother. 
 Hakim (Daniel Murillo): Hakim is Brian's good friend, who also attends Jefferson High School
 Al Miller (Paul Sorvino): Bill's father, a retired steelworker. When Bill was younger, Al left Bill and his mother, Louise, with little or no money, creating the main dynamic between Bill and Al. 
 Louise Miller (Sally Struthers): Bill's manipulative mother, who moved to Chicago after her divorce. She manipulates those around her by guilt-tripping them, and her controlling nature with Bill sets her constantly at odds with Judy. 
 Johnny (Clyde Kusatsu): Louise Miller's new love interest and eventual husband. He is Japanese.
 Bonnie (Ashley Tisdale): Brian's girlfriend.
 Becca (Lauren Schaffel): Lauren's best friend. 
 Ted Halverson (Kevin Nealon): The Millers' religious neighbor. 
 Kathy Halverson (Marin Mazzie): Ted Halverson's equally-religious wife. Kathy is usually the voice of reason, and dampens Ted's competitive nature.
 Matt Halverson (Shawn Pyfrom): Ted's son and one of Lauren's boyfriends.
 Shelly (Julia Campbell) and Terry (Justine Bateman): The Millers' lesbian neighbors, and mothers of Chris.
 Chris (Sean Marquette/Jared Hillman): Lauren's love interest in several episodes; Shelly and Terry's son. 
 Kyle Polsky (Todd Stashwick): Bill's neighbor, who has a large collection of toys.
 Carl (David Koechner): Bill's best friend during seasons 1 and 2. Works with Bill at the department store.
 Maxwell "Mack" McDaniel (John Marshall Jones): Bill and Fitz's friend during seasons 2 and 3 (6 episodes). Mack works with Bill and Fitz at the department store.
 Jeff Hackman (Chris Elliott): Also works with Bill. Sometimes called Jeff Hackman "Never-Pay-Ya-Backman".

Episodes 

Each of the episode titles begins with the word "Still", with the exception of the pilot.

Syndication 
The show entered off-network syndication in 2006, and in the fall of that year 20th Television put it into barter-syndication. It aired on many affiliates, most notably MyNetworkTV and The CW. Lifetime Television acquired the cable rights from 2006 to 2009. ABC Family acquired the rights to rerun it in the Fall of 2010, but due to low ratings, it was removed from their lineup. The show returned to ABC Family (now Freeform), from December 2013 to June 2014, before it was ultimately replaced by The Middle. As of 2021, the show has not aired on any cable channels since then.

Critical reception 

A 2002 Entertainment Weekly review gave Still Standing a "D" grade, calling it an "apathetic" show that "does zip to freshen the Fatty-Gets-a-Family formula."

Nielsen ratings

Notes

References 

 "Lifetime Adds Still Standing" (Variety)
 "Still Standing Readies for its Final Bow" (USA Today)
 "Still Standing Survives Critical Mass" (USA Today)
 Still Standing TV Character Biographies at TVacres.com
 List of productions at CBS Studio Center
 "July 7th Development Update" (TheFutonCritic.com)

External links 

 

2000s American sitcoms
2002 American television series debuts
2006 American television series endings
CBS original programming
Television series by 20th Century Fox Television
Television series by CBS Studios
Television shows set in Chicago
English-language television shows
Television series about families